Dúngal mac Cellaig (died 772) was a King of Osraige in modern County Kilkenny. He ruled from 770 to 772. He was of the dynasty known as the Dál Birn that ruled over Osraige in the early Christian period and was the son of Cellach mac Fáelchair (died 735), a previous king.

The Osraige plunged into civil war upon the death of Anmchad mac Con Cherca after 761. Tóim Snáma mac Flainn was opposed by the sons of Cellach, presumably Dúngal and in 761 they were defeated by Tóim Snáma and were put to flight. In 770 Tóim Snáma was slain presumably by Dúngal.

Notes

References

 Annals of the Four Masters at CELT: Corpus of Electronic Texts at University College Cork
 Book of Leinster,Reges Ossairge at CELT: Corpus of Electronic Texts at University College Cork
 Genealogies from Rawlinson B 502, compiled by Donnchadh Ó Corráin at CELT: Corpus of Electronic Texts at University College Cork

External links
CELT: Corpus of Electronic Texts at University College Cork

Kings of Osraige
FitzPatrick dynasty
8th-century Irish monarchs
772 deaths
People from County Kilkenny
Year of birth unknown